The Kerala Institute for Research Training and Development Studies of Scheduled Castes and Scheduled Tribes (KIRTADS) is a museum located in Chevarambalam near Chevayoor in Kozhikode.

It is a directorate under the Government of Kerala and functions under the Scheduled Castes and Scheduled Tribes Development (SCSTDD) ministry. Its main objective is to carry out research that helps to promote development among the scheduled communities in Kerala. It also attempts to identify the needs and problems confronting the marginalized section of the population and suggest recommendations to the government in finding a panacea for their overall development.

The museum was established in the year 1972 as Tribal Research and Training Center (TR&TC) in a national pattern, which was subsequently recognized as KIRTADS in 1979 and works among all the scheduled communities for their development. The institute is situated in Vrindavan Colony, Chevayur, Kozhikode. Apart from Anthropological Research, the institute also has training and development studies activities. The institute also has a reference library and ethnological museum as an auxiliary wing of KIRTADS.

See also
Kerala Institute for Research, Training and Development Studies of Scheduled Castes and Scheduled Tribes (KIRTADS)

References

Buildings and structures in Kozhikode
Museums in Kerala